A sign-on (or start-up in Commonwealth countries except Canada) is the beginning of operations for a radio or television station, generally at the start of each day. It is the opposite of a sign-off (or closedown in Commonwealth countries except Canada), which is the sequence of operations involved when a radio or television station shuts down its transmitters and goes off the air for a predetermined period; generally, this occurs during the overnight hours although a broadcaster's digital specialty or sub-channels may sign-on and sign-off at significantly different times as its main channels.

Like other television programming, sign-on and sign-off sequences can be initiated by a broadcast automation system, and automatic transmission systems can turn the carrier signal and transmitter on/off by remote control.

Sign-on and sign-off sequences have become less common due to the increasing prevalence of 24/7 broadcasting. However, some national broadcasters continue the practice; particularly those in countries with limited broadcast coverage. Stations may also sometimes close for transmitter maintenance, or to allow another station to broadcast on the same channel space.

Sign-on/start-up
Sign-ons, like sign-offs, vary from country to country, from station to station, and from time to time; however, most follow a similar general pattern. It is common for sign-ons to be followed by a network's early morning newscast, or their morning or breakfast show.

Some broadcasters that have ceased signing on and signing off in favour of 24-hour broadcasting may perform a sign-on sequence at a certain time in the morning (usually between 4:00 and 7:00 a.m.) as a formality to signify the start of its operating day (in the United States, the broadcast logging day begins at 6:00 a.m. local time).

Sign-on/start-up sequence
The sign-on sequence may include some or all of the following stages, but not necessarily in this order:
 For television or radio stations that cut off their signal during off-broadcast hours, a test pattern or a static image accompanied by a 400 Hz tone, a 1 kHz tone (or other single-sine-wave tones) or music may be broadcast fifteen to twenty minutes before the actual sign-on. Digital channels may still run overnight programs or interstitials at this time (ITV Nightscreen in the United Kingdom being an example), which conclude when the station's main programming schedule begins.
 A signal to turn on remote transmitters may be played—this is usually a series of touch tones.
 On radio stations, especially international stations on shortwave, an interval signal may be played in a loop, usually for 3 to 5 minutes before the actual broadcast starts.
 Technical information is provided. This can include station identification (call sign and city of license), transmitter power, frequency or channel number, translators used, transmitter locations, list of broadcast engineers, and/or studio/transmitter links (STL).
 A television station may show a video and photo montage set to the national anthem or other patriotic piece of music. The accompanying television video may include images of the national flag, the head of state, national heroes, national military soldiers, national symbols, and other nationalistic imagery (especially on state-owned broadcasters), or simply the station ident.  In the case of television stations broadcasting to audiences in more than one country, the flags and national symbols of each country in turn may be shown, with its respective national anthem being played.
 Ownership information about the station, and a list of related organizations.
 A greeting to viewers or listeners.
 Contact information, such as street and mailing addresses, telephone number, email, and website details.
 A prayer or other religious acknowledgement, particularly in countries with a state religion, in theocracies, and on religious broadcasters. 
 A schedule for the upcoming programs, or the day's programs.
 A disclaimer that station programming is taped, aired live, or originates from a television or radio network.
 Another disclaimer that programs are for personal use only (sometimes with information on copyright restrictions), and a statement that businesses cannot profit from showing them by applying a cover charge for viewing.
 A statement of commitment to quality; this may be in the form of a recognized standard, such as the Philippines' Broadcast Code of the Kapisanan ng mga Brodkaster ng Pilipinas (Association of Broadcasters of the Philippines).
 A station identification, including some or all of the television channel, AM or FM frequency, call sign, branding, and a clock ident.
 Generally a station jingle or slogan will be played, accompanied on television with video clips featuring station programming or personalities. The Start-Up/Sign-On Notice is announced after the national anthem.

While most of these sign-on steps are done as a service to the public, or for advertising reasons, some of them may be required by the government of the country.

Sign-off/closedown

Sign-offs, like sign-ons, vary from country to country, from station to station, and from time to time; however, most follow a similar general pattern. Many stations follow the reverse process to their sign-on sequence at the start of the day.

Many stations, while no longer conducting a sign-off and being off air for a period of time each day, instead run low–cost programming during those times of low viewer numbers. This may include infomercials, movies, television show reruns, simple weather forecasts, low cost news or infotainment programming from other suppliers, simulcasts of sister services, or feeds of local cable TV companies' programming via a fiber optic line to the cable headend. Other broadcasters that are part of a radio or television network may run an unedited feed of the network's overnight programming from a central location, without local advertising.  During what are otherwise closedown hours, some channels may also simulcast their teletext pages or full page headlines with music or feeds from sister radio stations playing in the background.  Some stations, after doing a sign-off, nonetheless continue to transmit throughout the off-air period on cable/satellite; this transmission may involve a test pattern, static image, local weather radar display, teletext pages or full-page headlines which was accompanied by music or a local weather radio service.

Sign-off/closedown sequence

The sign-off sequence may include some or all of the following stages, but not necessarily in this order:

 An announcement informing viewers that the station is about to go off-air: it may also include a message of thanks for the viewer's patronage, along with an announcement of the time when the station is scheduled to sign on again.
 A station jingle or slogan may be played, accompanied on television with video clips featuring station programming or personalities, or perhaps stock scenes from the station's main city/cities. A series of program trailers may also be played.
 A prayer, hymn, or other religious acknowledgement, particularly in countries with a state religion or theocracies, and on religious broadcasters. Other channels may opt for a pre-taped sermonette or something similar. See section below.
 A short weather forecast and newscast: some channels in the United Kingdom also used to include a public information film.
 A clock ident, which can be silent, play music or feature an announcer. 
 A program guide for the following day's programs.
 Closing credits acknowledging announcers, technicians and other crew who operated the day's broadcast.
 Ownership information about the station and their parent company, as well as their contact information.
 A disclaimer that programs are for personal use only (sometimes with information on copyright restrictions), and a statement that businesses cannot profit from showing them by applying a cover charge for viewing.
 The viewer may be encouraged to view or listen to alternative services during the station's downtime; these are usually sister or affiliate stations.
 A statement of commitment to quality, usually in the form of a recognized standard: in the Philippines, it is usually the Broadcast Code of the Kapisanan ng mga Brodkaster ng Pilipinas (Association of Broadcasters of the Philippines), while in the United States, it was (until 1983) the Television Code of the National Association of Broadcasters. Same as the start-up, the closedown/sign-off notice is shown before the National Anthem.  
 A television station may show a video and photo montage set to the national anthem or other patriotic piece of music. The accompanying television video may include images of the national flag, the head of state, national heroes, national military soldiers, national symbols, and other nationalistic imagery (especially on state-owned broadcasters, but sometimes on privately-owned ones too), or simply the station ident.  In the case of television stations broadcasting to audiences in more than one country, the flags and national symbols of each country in turn may be shown, with its respective national anthem being played.
 The station may display some type of novelty item, such as an animated character, particular to that station or its locale.
 Stations in the German-speaking parts of Europe (DACH) would use a slide with the station logo and the word Sendeschluss (in Germany and Austria also alternatively spelt Sendeschluß with an eszett, meaning "shutdown"), shown prior to the test card (as opposed to before the signal being cut) to tell the viewer to switch off their sets. This practice ceased around 1994–96.
 Viewers may be reminded to turn off their television sets just prior to the transmitter being switched off. This was historically practised in the United Kingdom and in many parts of the Eastern Bloc, and is still in regular practice in some places like Russia and some areas of Japan. Sometimes, a loud tone may be played on the audio to encourage sleeping viewers to turn their television sets off, in order to prevent electricity wastage and to mitigate the risk of fire and/or explosions occurring in older TV sets.
 On channels intended for young children, a short video may be shown of the channel's characters or hosts going to bed, before showing a loop of them sleeping throughout the night until programming resumes the following morning.
 Finally, stations may show a test card, station logo, a loop of the station ident, a black screen, or a static schedule (telling viewers of the programming line-up once broadcasting resumes), usually with a monotone sound or a relay of a radio station: some stations, such as BBC Two, may show a sequence of teletext pages, while others may use a promotional video or a series of infomercials. Other stations may simply cut off the signal, usually by sending a series of touch tones to turn off remote transmitters, which resulted in static on an analog television signal. Others may switch into a 24-hour channel or show archived programming.

Some countries have a legal protocol for signing-off: in the United States, the minimum requirement is the station's callsign, followed by its designated city of license. Many stations do include other protocols, such as the national anthem or transmitter information, as a custom, or as a service to the public.

In the United Kingdom, before the introduction of 24-hour television, there was no known legal protocol for a sign-off: BBC One and many ITV regions customarily included a continuity announcement, clock and the country's national anthem (for BBC One Wales and HTV Wales, Hen Wlad Fy Nhadau was also played beforehand), while BBC Two, Granada, Border, and Channel 4 signed-off with just a continuity announcement, clock and ident.

In Germany, it is a custom to play the national anthem (for Bayerischer Rundfunk and stations owned by ProSiebenSat.1 Media, the Bayernhymne was also played beforehand) and the European Union anthem.

In Spain, it is a custom to play the national anthem (for EITB and Televisión de Galicia, Eusko Abendaren Ereserkia and Os Pinos was also played beforehand respectively).

In the United States, it is common for a brief news reel to be broadcast over the station's logo, often accompanied by public service and missing and most wanted persons announcements.

Religious acknowledgements during sign-on and sign-off

Special sign-on/off cases

Historical
In a number of countries closedowns formerly took place during the daytime as well as overnight. In the United Kingdom this was initially due to government-imposed restrictions on daytime broadcasting hours, and later, due to budgetary constraints. The eventual relaxation of these rules meant that afternoon closedowns ceased permanently on the ITV network in October 1972, but the BBC maintained the practice until Friday 24 October 1986, before commencing a full daytime service on the following Monday. Afternoon closedowns continued in South Korea until December 2005. Hong Kong's broadcasting networks (particularly the English-speaking channels) also practiced this until mid-2008.  In these cases, the station's transmitters later did not actually shut-down for the afternoon break; either a test-card was played or a static schedule was posted telling viewers of the programming line-up once broadcasting resumes.

Medium-wave AM

Medium wave radio is a special case due to its unusual propagation characteristics; it can bounce hundreds of miles by reflecting from the upper atmosphere at night, but during the day these same layers absorb signal instead of reflecting. A few powerful regional clear-channel stations have an extensive secondary coverage area which is protected by having smaller local co-channel stations in distant communities sign off shortly before sunset. A frequency on which a broadcaster has to drastically reduce power or sign off entirely at sunset was traditionally the least desirable assignment, which would usually go to small or new-entrant stations when all of the more favourable slots were already allocated.

These AM daytimers are becoming less common as stations (and audiences) migrate to FM or to frequencies vacated by the closure of other stations, but a handful still exist in the US and México.

Religious

India
During religious holidays or occasions, Doordarshan and Akashvani will broadcast a prayer of any religion through the day, a week or a month (e.g. During Ramadan, a reading from the Quran, a Muslim quote, or a call for Azan and Fajr prayer will be broadcast. During Lent, a Christian prayer, a hymn or a psalm will be broadcast).

Malaysia
During Ramadan, Malaysian public broadcaster RTM operated TV1 24 hours a day instead of signing off. In 2012, TV1 broadcast 24 hours a day during the London Olympics in 2012, due to the time difference. This would become permanent in August 2012, to coincide with their sister channel TV2 by showing reruns from the broadcaster's archive library and movies on early mornings before start-up.

Philippines
During the Holy Week in the Philippines, terrestrial television and radio stations continue their regular broadcast schedules (including Lenten drama specials from Eat Bulaga! and It's Showtime) from Palm Sunday until Holy Wednesday. From the midnight of Holy Thursday until the early hours of Easter Sunday (before 4 AM PST on most commercial broadcasters), most non-religious television and radio networks either remain off-the-air for the duration of the timeframe or truncate their broadcasting hours. Special programming featured during the timeframe includes Lenten drama specials, religious-themed programming and news coverage of various services and rites. Catholic Media Network member stations also follow the latter pattern, broadcasting Easter Triduum services and other similar programming.

Campus radio stations' operations during this time are left to the discretion of their respective schools, colleges, or universities by either closing down on the afternoon and/or evening of Holy Wednesday or remaining off-air for the entire Holy Week.

On cable and satellite, with the exception of specialty channels that broadcast horse racing, cockfighting, and the like that remain dormant during this period, most international networks distributed in the Philippines or Philippine-exclusive cable channels continue to broadcast their 24/7 regular programming service week-long or continue with specially-arranged schedules from Holy Thursday to Black Saturday.

Notable historical exceptions
 2015 - when Typhoon Maysak (Chedeng) struck Aurora, some radio and television stations that were supposed to sign-off during the Triduum before the typhoon's landfall in the Philippines, aired news updates related to the typhoon.
 2020 - during the COVID-19 pandemic and the enhanced community quarantine in Luzon, government-controlled television and radio stations abandoned signing-off during the Paschal Triduum, while the daily #LagingHanda press briefings conducted by the Presidential Communications Operations Office augmented its broadcast operations. On commercial radio and television stations, news updates related to the pandemic were broadcast alongside special programming.

Indonesia
In Bali during Nyepi, all terrestrial television and radio stations go off-the-air.

See also
 Ceefax
 Dark (broadcasting)
 Digital television transition in the United States
 Goodnight Kiwi
 Indian-head test pattern
 ITV Nightscreen
 Short-term Analog Flash and Emergency Readiness Act
 Star Gazers
 Television sign-off routines in the United Kingdom
 Test Card F
 TVARK
 Turner Doomsday Video

Notes

References

External links
 TV-Signoffs.com - J. Alan Wall's website devoted to sign-offs and sign-ons of United States television stations
 TV-Ark

Interstitial television shows
Radio broadcasting
Television presentation
Television terminology

tl:Sign-on at sign-off